The Foreshadowing completed their third act of apocalypse saga Second World, released on April 20, 2012, under Cyclone Empire Records.

Second World combines cinematic atmospheres with doom metal riffs. The album was mixed by Dan Swanö at Unisound Studios (Örebro, Sweden), while well-known artist Travis Smith worked on the album illustrations and design. The recording sessions were held at Outer Sound Studios in Rome with Giuseppe Orlando.

Guitarist Alessandro Pace stated: "This is gonna be, without any reasonable doubt, absolutely metal. We worked hard to step forward and gaining our melodic side, while at the same time we wrote the most groundbreaking rhythms we ever played. This is gonna be an album with no compromises, it's gonna be a blast!"

Keyboardist Francesco Sosto commented: "With Second World we wanted to demonstrate that our band knows how to use the work we did in the past, as the major source of inspiration for this work were our two previous albums. But we also wanted to add something new, like true Gregorian choirs and acoustic parts, and also tried to structure the songs in a different way from how we normally do, like we did with “Colonies”..."

Track listing
 Havoc - 7:22
 Outcast - 4:51
 The Forsaken Son - 4:41
 Second World - 5:38
 Aftermaths - 6:29
 Ground Zero - 4:31
 Reverie Is a Tyrant - 5:16
 Colonies - 6:21
 Noli Timere - 6:01
 Friends of Pain - 4:01

Personnel
Marco Benevento - vocals
Alessandro Pace - guitars
Andrea Chiodetti - guitars
Francesco Sosto - keyboards
Francesco Giulianelli - bass
Jonah Padella - drums

Production
Mixed and mastered by Dan Swanö
Recorded at Outer Sound Studios in Rome with Giuseppe Orlando

Cover art
Design by Travis Smith

References

2012 albums
The Foreshadowing (band) albums